Tweneboa Kodua Senior High School is a second cycle institution found in the township of Kumawu in the Ashante Region. The school is mixed-sex, and was opened in 1959.

References 

Schools in Ghana
Ashanti Region